Isábena, in , or in , is a municipality located in the province of Huesca, Aragon, Spain. According to the 2004 census (INE), the municipality has a population of 278 inhabitants.

The town rises at the feet of the rocky Morrón de Güell mountain range.

Twin towns 

  Saint-Bertrand-de-Comminges, 2018

See also
Isábena River

References

Municipalities in the Province of Huesca